The tornado outbreak sequence of March 1913 was a devastating series of tornado outbreaks that affected the northern Great Plains, the Southern United States, and sections of the upper Midwest over a two-day-long period between March 21–23, 1913. Composed of two outbreaks, the sequence first began with a tornado outbreak that commenced in Mississippi early on March 21. Several significant tornadoes occurred, one of which killed seven people in one family and another destroyed much of Lower Peach Tree, Alabama, with 27 deaths all in that town. The tornado at Lower Peach Tree is estimated to have been equivalent to a violent F4 tornado on the Fujita scale, based upon damage accounts. The tornadoes occurred between 0630–1030 UTC, or pre-dawn local time, perhaps accounting for the high number of fatalities—a common trend in tornadoes in the Dixie Alley. In all, tornadoes in Mississippi, Georgia, and Alabama killed 48 people, perhaps more, that day and injured at least 150 people.

March 23, Easter Sunday, was the most violent tornado outbreak to affect the northern Great Plains on so early a date in the year—a record that still stands as of 2020. That day, four F4 tornadoes affected portions of eastern Nebraska and western Iowa, killing at least 168 people. Damage in Omaha reached at least F4, possibly even F5, intensity, though confirmation of F5 damage could not be determined from available evidence. The tornado is the 13th deadliest ever to affect the United States and the deadliest to hit the U.S. state of Nebraska as of 2014. No other violent tornado would affect Omaha for another 62 years. Outside the Great Plains, the outbreak of March 23 also produced two other F4 tornadoes, one each in Missouri and Indiana, including a devastating path more than  through southern Terre Haute, Indiana, killing 21 people and injuring 250.

In all, the two consecutive outbreaks killed at least 241 people and caused at least 19 tornadoes, though only significant events were recorded and other, weaker tornadoes may have gone undetected. The outbreak sequence also produced seven violent tornadoes, nearly half the documented total of tornadoes for the sequence. Tornadoes struck Nebraska, Iowa, Illinois, Missouri, Michigan, and Indiana. At least $9.68 million in damages were reported.

Background
A series of potent storm systems traversed the US during March 1913, described by the US Weather Bureau as "...the most extraordinary situation in regards to the weather since the creation of the bureau."  Anomalously high moisture had gathered near the US Gulf Coast, as an intense upper level storm system moved in from the west.  According to retrospective numerical modeling of this event, a strong cap aloft was in place over the central Plains, as is common as the elevated mixed layer advects eastward from the Rockies.  Observations taken at 13Z 23 March 1913 showed that surface low pressure was located in Colorado, and a warm front stretched due eastward from there into Illinois.  Morning temperatures near this front were in the 30s.  South of the front warmer and moister air was present, but dewpoints in the upper 50s were confined to southern Oklahoma and Arkansas, far away from where the tornadoes were to later occur in eastern Nebraska and western Iowa.

As the day progressed, the surface low ejected through Nebraska, with a dry line and trailing cold front.  South winds blowing 40-50 knots at times brought the moister air rapidly northward.  One of the worst dust storms on record occurred behind the dry line in western Kansas, but in the warm sector the day remained dry until mid afternoon when light showers began to form in central Nebraska.  A cooperative observer in Osceola noted that the wind shifted from S to NW at 2230Z (4:30 PM local).  Professors at the University of Nebraska at Lincoln noted that the relative humidity there jumped from 53% at 2150Z to 78% at 2230Z, indicating much higher dewpoints had rapidly arrived in Lincoln since the cold front was still to the west near Osceola.  They also noted that the surface low passed just to the north of Omaha and was in western Iowa at 01Z 24 March 1913.

With all of this observed information, it is likely that the quality moisture required to produce convection strong enough for tornadoes arrived just an hour or two before the strong forcing associated with the surface low pressure and attendant frontal systems.  At the time of the tornadoes it is estimated that surface temperatures were in the upper 60s, dewpoints were in the upper 50s, and surface winds were southerly around 25-30 knots.  Numerical modeling estimates that 500 hPa flow was around 80 knots from the WSW and that CAPE was from 1000–2000 J/kg.  These conditions are similar to those found in other tornado outbreaks.  Tornadic storms developed from 5:00-6:00 PM local time and while storm motions were to the NE, the prevalence of tornadic storms moved southward with the dryline/cold front intersection, lasting until 8:00 PM local in NW Missouri.  A serial derecho then formed and moved across Iowa and Illinois through the nighttime hours, hitting Chicago in the early morning.

Outbreak statistics

Confirmed tornadoes

March 21 event

March 23 event

Omaha, Nebraska

The Omaha Easter Sunday tornado struck Omaha, Nebraska, at approximately 6:00 p.m. on March 23, 1913.

The Omaha tornado followed the path of Little Papillion Creek as it entered the city. It moved through the west side of town alongside the Missouri Pacific Railroad, destroying the small workers cottages in the area. The tornado was so strong that steel train cars were later found pierced by pieces of shattered lumber from the demolished homes.

By the time the tornado reached Dewey Avenue it was five blocks wide. When it reached Farnam Hill, the tornado followed a shallow valley through this upscale neighborhood. The large mansions of Farnam were no match for the winds, and many houses were torn to pieces, along with several in the Gold Coast Historic District including the Joslyn Castle, which sustained considerable damage. Buildings were found chopped in half, pipes and supports dangling into space, such as the Duchesne Academy which was nearly obliterated.

At North 24th and Lake Streets in the Near North Side neighborhood a large African American crowd was enjoying an Easter Sunday performance when the tornado flattened the building and killed more than two dozen people. Other brick structures in this small commercial district took similar hits, and more people died here than in any other part of Omaha. A streetcar running down North 24th Street in North Omaha encountered the tornado near this area. Thanks to the quick action of operator Ord Hensley in ordering passengers to lie on the floor of the car, everyone survived. Later, photographers would spot the wrecked machine and would call it the "Streetcar of Death", imagining that no one on board could have survived given the immense damage.

The F4 tornado skirted the downtown area and moved over the Missouri River into Iowa, causing further damage before dissipating.

In all, 103 people died, 94 of which were in Omaha, and another 400 were injured. Reportedly, 2,000 homes in Omaha alone were destroyed, with $8 million total damage from the storm, $5.5 million of which was in Omaha (financial damage estimates vary; the NOAA reports more damage than this). In the aftermath of the tornado, a cold front moved into Omaha and caused further misery, as newly homeless residents struggled to escape the snowy weather. Many homes throughout the northern side of the city were leveled, and some were swept away. Photographs at the time showed empty foundations, which possibly indicated F5 damage, but these may have been related to post-tornado clean-up.

Non-tornadic effects
The same storm system that struck Nebraska created a dust storm in Kansas and hit Missouri with hail and heavy rain. The Omaha tornado marked the beginning of the destruction from storms associated with the Great Flood of 1913. On Monday and Tuesday, March 24 and 25, the storms brought heavy rains to the Midwest and upstate New York, causing widespread flooding.

Aftermath
Remarkably, operators from the Webster Telephone Exchange Building in Omaha did not leave their stations either during or after the tornado. The building was used as an infirmary for the wounded and dying, with physicians and nurses coming from area hospitals. US Army troops from Fort Omaha set up headquarters in the building, as soldiers patrolled the area for looters and to offer assistance.

Initially, James Dahlman, the longtime mayor of Omaha, refused assistance from any outside sources, including the federal government. However, he relented after seeing the extent of the damage throughout the city. The federal government poured in assistance soon after. The massive damage caused by the tornado inspired new engineering techniques aimed at creating a tornado-proof edifice. The first such building was the First National Bank of Omaha building, built in 1916 at 1603 Farnam Street. The 14-story building was built in a "U"-shape.

See also
 2020 Easter tornado outbreak - Another deadly tornado outbreak during Easter weekend 107 years later.
 Disaster Books – Omaha Easter Sunday Tornado
 Great Dayton Flood
 List of North American tornadoes and tornado outbreaks
 List of tornadoes causing 100 or more deaths
 List of tornadoes striking downtown areas
 Timeline of North Omaha, Nebraska history

Notes

References

Bibliography

Encyclopedia of Southern Culture, Vol. I, ed. Charles Reagan Wilson and William Ferris (New York: Anchor Books, 1989).

External links
 National Oceanic and Atmospheric Administration
(n.d.) Omaha's Terrible Evening. Tragic Story of America's Greatest Disaster.

F4 tornadoes by date
 ,1913-03-21
Tornadoes of 1913
Tornadoes in Nebraska
Natural disasters in Omaha, Nebraska
North Omaha, Nebraska
Omaha Easter Sunday tornado
1913 natural disasters in the United States
March 1913 events in the United States